Encephalartos umbeluziensis is a species of cycad in Africa.

Description
It is an acaule cycad, with an underground stem, up to 30 cm long and 25 cm in diameter. 
The leaves, from 2 to 5, pinnate, slightly arched, are 1–2 m long, supported by a thin petiole, 5–10 cm long; they are composed of numerous pairs of lanceolate, leathery leaflets, up to 30 cm long, with 1 spine on the upper margin and 1-3 spines on the lower one.
It is a dioecious species, with male specimens showing 1 to 4 subcylindrical, pedunculated cones, 25–35 cm long and 6–8 cm broad, ranging from olive green to yellowish, and female specimens with 1-4 cylindrical cones, long 25–30 cm and 12–15 cm wide, the same color as the male ones.
The seeds are roughly ovoid, 2.5-3.5 cm long, covered with a brown sarcotesta.

References

External links
 
 

umbeluziensis